Borac Incel Swimming Club, on Serbian  (Serbian Cyrillic: Пливачки клуб Бopaц) is a swimming club from Banja Luka, Republika Srpska. It was founded in 1955.
The club participated in various tournaments.

Results
Results achieved by the swimming club in the former Yugoslavia include:
  Gold, silver and bronze medals in the Junior category.
  Bronze medal in the Senior category.
  Two bronze medals in the Relays - Senior category.
  Three gold, two silver and three bronze medals in the Pioneers category.

External links 
Sport association Borac 
Official website 

Sport in Banja Luka
Swimming clubs